The National Queer Asian Pacific Islander Alliance (NQAPIA) is an American federation of  Asian American, South Asian, Southeast Asian. and Pacific Islander LGBTQ organizations. NQAPIA was formed in 2007, as an outgrowth of the LGBT APA Roundtable working groups at the 2005 National Gay Lesbian Task Force Creating Change Conference in Oakland, California. NQAPIA seeks to build the capacity of local LGBT AAPI organizations, invigorate grassroots organizing, develop leadership, and challenge homophobia, racism, and anti-immigrant bias. The organization "focuses on grass-roots organizing and leadership development."

NQAPIA works with local LGBTQ AAPI groups to address a wide range of LGBTQ AAPI issues such as speaking out for immigration reform, partnering with the National Gay & Lesbian Task Force on a national survey of the needs and concerns of LGBTQ AAPIs, support convenings for queer women and South Asians, leading workshops on organizing LGBTQ AAPIs for social change, and hosting national trainings and issue briefings for leaders of LGBTQ AAPI organizations.

Profile of LGBTQ AAPI Organizations 

Thirty-four LGBTQ AAPI organizations from across the United States are members of NQAPIA. Two are national organizations. Most LGBTQ AAPI organizations are located in areas with large populations of Asian Americans and Pacific Islanders. The largest population centers are in the San Francisco Bay Area and the Greater Los Angeles Area. Following these are the communities in New York City, the metropolitan Washington, D.C., area, and New England.

Some LGBTQ AAPI organizations are organized by ethnicity or gender. 
 Seven are South Asian groups.
 Two are Southeast Asian groups.
 Six serve specific ethnic communities, including Chinese, Filipinos, Vietnamese, and Koreans.
 Five are predominantly women's organizations with Non-Profit Status (three of which are inclusive of transgender people).
 Five are predominantly men's organizations (two of which are inclusive of transgender people).
 Four are LGBTQ projects of mainstream, larger AAPI organizations.
 Three are specifically youth organizations, all of which are housed within larger organizations that also provide staff support.

Map of lesbian, gay, bisexual, and transgender Asian American, South Asian, and Pacific Islander organizations

Pacific Northwest

 API Pride of Portland, Oregon
 Trikone – Northwest, Northwest, Seattle, Washington
 UTOPA – Seattle, Washington
 Project Q of API, Chaya, Seattle, Washington
 Pride ASIA, Seattle, Washington

Northern California

 API Equality — Northern California, San Francisco, California
Asian Pacific Islander Queer Women and Transgender Community (APIQWTC), Bay Area, California
 GLBTQ+ Asian Pacific Alliance (GAPA), San Francisco
 South Bay Queer and Asian, San Jose, California
 Trikone, San Francisco, California
 UTOPIA – San Francisco, California

Southern California

 API PFLAG San Gabriel Valley, California
 Barangay, Los Angeles, California
 Satrang, Los Angeles, California
 Koreans United for Equality (KUE), California
 UTOPIA – San Diego, California
 Viet Rainbow Orange County (VROC), California
 API Pride Council, Los Angeles, California
 Malaya Project, Los Angeles, California

Midwest

 Shades of Yellow (SOY), Minneapolis, Minnesota
 Invisible to Invincible: Asian Pacific Islander Pride of Chicago (i2i), IL
 Trikone, Chicago, Illinois
 Freedom Inc., Madison, Wisconsin

The South

 Trikone - Atlanta, Georgia
 Khush, Texas, Austin, Texas
 VAYLA – New Orleans, Louisiana

New England

  Massachusetts Area South Asian Lambda Association (MASALA), Boston, Massachusetts
 Queer Asian Pacific-Islander Alliance (QAPA), Boston, Massachusetts

Greater New York City Area

 Asian Pride Project, New York
 Dari Project, New York
 Gay Asian & Pacific Islander Men of New York (GAPIMNY)
 Q-WAVE, NY
 SALGA, NY
 PFLAG NYC Chapter – API Project

Mid-Atlantic/Metro D.C. Area

 Asian Pacific Islander Queers United for Action (AQUA), Washington, D.C.
 Asian Pacific Islander Queer Sisters (APIQS), Washington, D.C.
 hotpot!, Philadelphia, Pennsylvania
 Khush – DC, Washington, D.C.

Pacific Islands

 Pride Marianas, Spain
 Guam Alternative Lifestyle Association (GALA)
 Nolu Ehu, Waianae, Hawaii

National

 Muslim Alliance for Sexual and Gender Diversity (MASGD)
 Network on Religion and Justice (NRJ)
 Desi lgbtQ Helpline (DeQH)
 Queer South Asian National Network (QSANN)

Participating organizations

 API Equality - Los Angeles, California
 Providence Youth Student Movement (PrYSM), Providence, Rhode Island

Activist activities

Conferences

Every three years, NQAPIA coordinates national conferences for queer Asian Pacific Islander American Issues. Prior conferences were held in Seattle, Washington and Washington, D.C., in 2009 and 2012 respectively. In 2015, NQAPIA's conference was held in Chicago, Illinois, from August 6–9, 2015.

Goals

NQAPIA strives for inclusion of LGBT minority groups in both macro and micro-scopic scales through the use of conferences and community outreach programs. By providing education, social networks of support, and organization of federations and members, it aims to "press a positive agenda" to integrate LGBT racial and ethnic minorities in their communities.

Activities
 Conferences & summits: discuss racial and transgender issues on an international platform.
 Workshops: raise awareness about a multitude of topics (ranging from skills and professional development to health and wellness).
 Caucuses: create specific networks of support for individualized aid (such as networks based on region).
 Social & cultural activities: educate and acknowledge cultures as a community.

Summits 
The NQAPIA organizes a weekend long training and issues briefing for leaders of LGBTQ API organizations. Local leaders from across the nation convene to network, learn about current issues, share strategies, and build the infrastructure of their respective organizations. In 2013, the NQAPIA Summit was in Hawai’i. NQAPIA Summits alternate between West and East Coasts.

Programs and campaigns 
The NQAPIA curates projects and campaigns which empower the queer Asian communities around the nation.

LGBT Immigrants' Rights
A campaign focused on immigration reform and upholding LGBT Asian American Pacific Islander immigrant rights by "educating local organizations and leaders", engaging in media in various forms and mediums, publicizing the stories of undocumented LGBT Asian American Pacific Islanders (as well as undocumented Latinos), and analyzing immigration reform legislation and the effect that legislation changes will have.

Family is Still Family
A multilingual campaign focused on educating Asian and Pacific Islander parents of LGBT youth, aimed to guide them in supporting their child and maintaining strong family bonds. This is accomplished through videos translated into Chinese, Korean, Japanese, Indonesian, Vietnamese, Thai, Khmer, Hmong, Lao, Hindi, Tagalog, Ilocano, Arabic, and other languages as well as multilingual leaflets, "family acceptance workshops", advertisements for LGBT pride month, and features on various news channels, such as MSNBC, NBC, and The Korea Times.

DACA Undocumented Youth
DACA/DAPA are both programs targeted at undocumented immigrants, particularly families. DACA (deferred action for childhood arrivals) allows for individuals to remain in the United States and obtain work permits if they are qualified to do so; however, it is not a route to obtaining permanent residence or citizenship status. Due to "legal challenges", the expanded DACA and DAPA programs are currently unavailable, but the original 2012 DACA program is open to the public. DAPA (deferred action for parental accountability) is orchestrated by the United States Citizenship and Immigration Services in order to temporarily provide aid to undocumented immigrants who are parents of U.S. citizens or lawful permanent residents and provides "relief from deportation and work authorization" for three years, but is currently not accepting applications.

Uncovering Our Stories: The Voices of LGBTQ AAPI Immigrants
"Uncovering Our Stories" was accomplished with the help of Mia Nakano, a director who worked on numerous other projects with similar themes. Its goal is to uncover the stories of immigrants who are "everyday" LGBT Asian American and Pacific Islanders, but whose stories rarely see coverage. The ultimate mission of this campaign is various levels of immigration reform, including greater family immigration rights and protections. It features Sapna Pandya, Erika Nunez, Tony Choi, Nebula Li, Rajat Dutta, Shweta Jumar, Maya Jafer, Dhaval Shah, John Sanchez, Chetam & Gaurav, Bupendra Ram, Sandy, Erwin de Leon, Alex Ong, Noel Bordador, Urooj Arshad, Linda & Lundy Khoy, and Sahar shafqat.

Multilingual Visibility Postcards
Through the use of printed postcards featuring various Asian American and Pacific Islanders, this campaign aims to "increase visibility of LGBT AAPIs". It features a variety of languages, from Korean to Thai to Bengali to Vietnamese, with a motif on front expressing support for same-sex marriage, immigrant rights, and queer/Asian pride.

Honors and awards

NQAPIA Community Catalyst Awards
The NQAPIA Community Catalyst Awards are awarded to individual and organizations that have:
 performed "substantive work in support of AAPI and/or LGBT communities"
 are capable of drawing sponsors to the event
 can commit to being present at the event

Nominees are accepted through online submission. Past awardees include:

2010 Awardees
Lola Lai Jong, Chicago, IL 
Mohammad Abdollah, Ann Arbor, MI 
Lunar New Year for All Coalition, New York, NY (August 28, 2010 Chicago IL)

2011 Awardees 
Lance Toma and the Asian and Pacific Islander Wellness Center, San Francisco, CA 
Sống Thật Radio, San Jose, CA

2012 Awardees
 Rep. Mike Honda
 The Asian American Justice Center
 Urooj Arshad

2013 Awardees
 Esera Tuaolo
 UNITE HERE! Local 5

2014 Awardees
 Andy Marra
 Q-WAVE
 Namita Chad

2015 Awardees

New York
 Dennis Chin
 Clara Yoon
 GABRIELA-USA

Chicago
 I Li Hsiao
 Liz Thomson
 Marsha and Tad Aizumi (parents of Aiden Aizumi)
 Freedom Inc.

2016 Awardees

New York
 Conrad Ricamora
 Asian/Pacific/American Institute at NYU
 Faisal Alam

Boston
 Amit Dixit
 Past QAPA Steering Committee Members

Washington
 Sapna Pandya
 Hector Vargas 
 Sharon Wong

Published work

Yearly reports
NQAPIA releases yearly reports/news magazines detailing their activities, highlights of their national conference (if applicable), various features and articles, award information, financial statements.

2016 election information
For the American 2016 election, NQAPIA released a series of reports on the election, including voter guides in Chinese, Hindi, Korean, and Vietnamese; resources to understand the issues each candidate was campaigning on and to protect Asian American Pacific Islander voting rights; and information on how to vote.

Current events information
Various infographics, articles, letters, blog posts, and the like are posted on a variety of topics related to Asian American Pacific Islanders' issues, such as political events.

References

LGBT organizations in the United States
2007 establishments in the United States